Patrick Byrne (born April 11, 1965) is an American former ice sledge hockey player. He won a gold medal with Team USA at the 2002 Winter Paralympics. He is a member of the Illinois Hockey Hall of Fame.

References

Living people
1965 births
Paralympic sledge hockey players of the United States
American sledge hockey players
Paralympic gold medalists for the United States
Medalists at the 2002 Winter Paralympics
Paralympic medalists in sledge hockey
Ice sledge hockey players at the 2002 Winter Paralympics